The Civil Service Institute (CSI) is a public institute located in Hargeisa, the capital of Somaliland. The institution was founded in 2005. The current president of the institute is Omer Eid Qalonbi. The institute was primarily aimed to develop and improve the capacity of public institutions and to discharge an effective and equitable public service delivery to the public.

See also
Somaliland Civil Service Commission
University of Hargeisa

References

External links
Official website 

Universities in Somaliland
Hargeisa
Educational institutions established in 2010
2010 establishments in Somaliland